C. Manickam is an Indian politician and former Member of the Legislative Assembly of Tamil Nadu. He was elected to the Tamil Nadu legislative assembly from Tiruchirappalli - I constituency as an Anna Dravida Munnetra Kazhagam candidate in 1977 election.

References 

All India Anna Dravida Munnetra Kazhagam politicians
Living people
Year of birth missing (living people)